Leloup is a French surname meaning "the wolf". Notable people with the surname include:

Colette Leloup (1924–2007),  French film executive
Jean Leloup (born 1961), Canadian singer-songwriter
Roger Leloup (born 1933), Belgian comics artist
Hubert Le Loup de Beaulieu

French-language surnames
Surnames from nicknames